IJ Mitchell of Blyth, South Australia advertised Advance motorcycles built to order in 1905–06. At least one machine was registered.

References

See also
List of motorcycles of 1900 to 1909

Motorcycle manufacturers of Australia
Motorcycles of Australia
Motorcycles introduced in the 1900s